Onur Atasayar (born 1 January 1995 in Tavşanlı, Turkey) is a Turkish footballer who plays as a left-back for Ümraniyespor.

Professional career
Onur made his footballing debut in the TFF First League for Ankaragücü in a 1-0 loss to İstanbul Güngörenspor on 8 September 2013. Onur transferred to Bursaspor in January 2017, making his professional debut on 17 February 2017. On 20 July 2022 after 5 seasons with Bursaspor, he transferred to Ümraniyespor signing a 1+1 year contract.

International career
Onur is a youth international for the Turkey, having played for the Turkey U19s and U20s.

References

External links
 
 
 

1995 births
Living people
People from Tavşanlı
Turkish footballers
Turkey youth international footballers
MKE Ankaragücü footballers
Bursaspor footballers
Ümraniyespor footballers
Süper Lig players
TFF First League players
TFF Second League players
Association football fullbacks